Maculatoscelis is a genus of mantises belonging to the family Amorphoscelidae.

The species of this genus are found in Africa.

Species:

Maculatoscelis ascalaphoides 
Maculatoscelis gilloni 
''Maculatoscelis maculata (Roy, 1965)

References

Amorphoscelidae